= Packs Branch =

Packs Branch may refer to:

- Packs Branch, West Virginia, an unincorporated community
- Packs Branch (Paint Creek), a stream in West Virginia
