= Packs Branch, West Virginia =

- Unincorporated community
- Location within West Virginia Location within the United States
- Coordinates: 37°54′19″N 81°14′4″W
- Country: United States
- State: West Virginia
- County: Fayette
- Elevation: 1,729 ft (527 m)
- Time zone: UTC-5 (Eastern (EST))
  - Summer (DST): UTC-4 (EDT)
- GNIS ID: 1544505

Packs Branch is an unincorporated community in Fayette County, West Virginia, United States. It was also called O'Neals.

The community was named after nearby Packs Branch.
