= Packs Branch (Paint Creek tributary) =

Stream in West Virginia, U.S.

Coordinates: 37°54′35″N 81°15′37″W

Packs Branch is a stream in the U.S. state of West Virginia.

Packs Branch was named after a local early settler.

== See also ==
- List of rivers of West Virginia
